The brown emutail (Bradypterus brunneus) is an emutail in the family Locustellidae.
It is found only in Madagascar.
Its natural habitat is subtropical or tropical moist montane forests.
It is threatened by habitat loss.

References

brown emutail
Endemic birds of Madagascar
brown emutail
Taxonomy articles created by Polbot
Fauna of the Madagascar lowland forests
Fauna of the Madagascar subhumid forests